The Sri Lanka Police First Aid Medal ( Śrī Laṃkā Polis Prathamādhāra Padakkama) is awarded to police officers in Sri Lanka for being successful in the first aid examination for ten consecutive years. Its design is based on the Service Medal of the Order of St John.

Description
The cupro-nickel, rhodium-plated medal features the head of Queen Victoria and the legend  VICTORIA + D + G + BRITT + REG + F + D + IND + IMP on one side, while the other displays the legend MAGNUS · PRIORATUS · ORDINIS · HOSPITALIS · SANCTI · JOHANNIS · JERUSALEM · IN · ANGLIA (Grand Priory of the Order of the Hospital of St. John of Jerusalem in England) along with five equally sized circles in a cross holding individual heraldic icons supported by sprawling St John's Wort. These are the St Edward’s Crown, the shield of Great Britain, two icons of the Order of St John in England, and the cipher bearing the feathers of the Prince of Wales. The "only British medal to retain the head of Queen Victoria on a current issue", the image utilized is based on a bust of the queen created by Princess Louise, Duchess of Argyll.

Where additional services beyond those required for the award have been performed, the ribbon may display bars and laurel leaves.

References

External links
Sri Lanka Police

Civil awards and decorations of Sri Lanka
Law enforcement awards and honors
Awards established in 1982
1982 establishments in Sri Lanka